was the fifth of six s, built for the Imperial Japanese Navy under the Circle One Program (Maru Ichi Keikaku). Three were laid down in JFY 1931 and the next three in JFY 1933.

History
Construction of the advanced Hatsuharu-class destroyers was intended to give the Imperial Japanese Navy smaller and more economical destroyers than the previous  and  destroyers, but with essentially the same weaponry. These conflicting goals proved beyond contemporary destroyer design, and the initial ships of this class were top-heavy design, with severe stability problems and with inherent structural weaknesses. After the "Tomozuru Incident" of 1934 and "IJN 4th Fleet Incident" in 1935, Ariake underwent extensive design changes and modifications prior to launch to remedy these issues.

Ariake was laid down at Kawasaki Shipyards in Kobe on 14 January 1933, launched on 23 September 1934 and commissioned on 25 March 1935.

Operational history

Afterward, she was based at Staring Bay, in Sulawesi from which she conducted escort patrol missions to the end of March. She returned to Sasebo Naval Arsenal for repairs from 22 March to 15 April 1942. In May, she was reassigned to escort the cruisers  and  back to Kure.

During the Battle of Midway, she was part of the escort for the Aleutian diversionary force under Admiral Shirō Takasu. Reassigned to the IJN 2nd Fleet on 14 July, she was then detached for temporary duty with the IJN 4th Fleet in a sortie from Truk to Jaluit on 20 August. After bombarding Nauru on 23 August, a landing party from Ariake occupied that island as part of "Operation RY" on 26 August until relieved by a garrison force on 30 August. Ariake was then assigned to the Solomon Islands, participating in a troop transport run to land the Ichiki and Aoba Detachments on Guadalcanal, and shelling Henderson Field. From September through December 1942, she was assigned to numerous Tokyo Express high-speed transport runs throughout the Solomon Islands. On 17 December, she attacked and claimed sinking an unidentified submarine, but the report remains unconfirmed. At the end of December, she suffered significant damage near Rabaul in an air raid by USAAF B-24 bombers while towing the damaged destroyer . Six near misses killed 28 crewmen and injured 40 others, disabling her No.2 and No.3 gun turrets.

After returning to Sasebo for major repairs through the middle of February 1943, Ariake escorted a convoy to Truk and the end of February and another convoy from Truk to Rabaul and back to Yokosuka at the end of April. She returned to Truk at the end of the month as escort for the aircraft carrier , returning with the battleship  at the end of May. In early June, she was docked for repairs, except for a sortie to escort the carrier  to Truk, and to return with the same damaged ship a few days later.

On 27–28 July 1943, Ariake was on a troop transport run to Tuluvu, New Britain. After grounding on a reef near Cape Gloucester with the destroyer , Ariake was able to work free. She was sunk while also engaged by U.S. Army B-25 Mitchells. Seven men were killed, along with Ariakes captain, LtCdr Akifumi Kawahashi.

Notes

References

 OCLC 77257764

External links

Hatsuharu-class destroyers
World War II destroyers of Japan
Shipwrecks in the Bismarck Sea
World War II shipwrecks in the Pacific Ocean
Ships built by Kawasaki Heavy Industries
1934 ships
Maritime incidents in July 1943
Destroyers sunk by aircraft
Ships sunk by US aircraft